Terwilliger Boulevard is a street in Portland, Oregon, U.S.  It begins at SW 6th Avenue and SW Sheridan Street south of Portland State University. It passes through the neighborhoods of Marquam Hill, Southwest Hills, and Burlingame and by Lewis and Clark College before ending at Oregon Route 43 in Lake Oswego.  For portions of its route, it is a traditional parkway through Duniway and Marquam Parks.  The land surrounding Terwilliger Boulevard is heavily wooded in nature.

The road was first planned for use as a pleasure parkway in the 1903 park plan prepared by the Olmsted Brothers. The parkway was completed in 1915.  It is named for James Terwilliger, who owned the land on which the parkway was built.  The roadway, or portions of it, were listed on the National Register of Historic Places in 2021.
 
It is the namesake of the Terwilliger curves, one of the most dangerous stretches of I-5 in Oregon, and possibly also The Simpsons character Robert Terwilliger / Sideshow Bob.

Points of interest
(listed north to south)
 Duniway Park
 Oregon Health & Science University campus, including
 Portland Aerial Tram
 Shriners Hospital
 Portland VA Medical Center
 Terwilliger Parkway
 Marquam Nature Park
 Capitol Highway
 George Himes Park
 Barbur Boulevard
 Interstate 5
 Taylors Ferry Road
 Boones Ferry Road
 Tryon Creek State Natural Area

Transit
North of Capitol Highway (shared by Oregon Route 10 in the area where Terwilliger crosses), the street is served by TriMet bus line 8, and south of Capitol Highway bus lines 38 and 39 serve some sections of it.

See also

 List of streets in Portland, Oregon

References

External links

Streets in Portland, Oregon
Parkways in the United States
1915 establishments in Oregon
National Register of Historic Places in Portland, Oregon